{{Infobox book
| name              = Eze Goes to School
| image             = 
| image_size        = 
| border            = 
| alt               = 
| caption           = 
| author            = 
 Onuora Nzekwu
 Michael Crowder

| illustrator       = Adebayo Ajayi
| country           = Nigeria
| language          = English
| genre             = Literary Fiction
| set_in            = Nigeria
| publisher         = Heinemann Publishers
| publisher2        = 
| pub_date          = 1963
| published         = 
| media_type        = Print (paperback)
| pages             = 79 pp (first edition)
| series            = African Writers Series
| isbn              = 978-0602219352
| isbn_note         = (first edition)
| oclc              = 655015080
| dewey             = 
| congress          = 
| preceded_by       = High Life for Lizards
| followed_by       = The Chima Dynasty in Onitsha| website           = 
}}Eze Goes to School is a 1963 children novel co-written by Nigerian writer Onuora Nzekwu and British writer Michael Crowder. It was published in 1963 under the African Writers Series by Heinemann Publishers.

Plot summaryEze Goes To School centers mainly on Eze Adi,  the protagonist of the novel who struggles to get formal education due to his poor family background. Eze finally makes a name for himself due to his intelligence. The novel exhibits the struggles of getting formal education in Nigeria in the 90's. These include truancy, cultism and poverty. Nzekwu and Crowder explains this albeit making it understandable for children.

Reception
The novel gathered positive reviews. Daily Trust listed it as one of the books every child must read. It is regarded as one of the evergreen books that tells the Nigerian story. It is also among literature texts that influenced kids in the 90's by The Cable Lifestyle. Rudolf Ogoo Okonkwo writing for Sahara Reporters'', noted that the novel is among the "...elements of the forces acting everywhere East of the Niger today."

References 

1963 Nigerian novels
Novels set in Nigeria
Children's novels
Nigerian English-language novels
1963 children's books